Saydam is a Turkish surname. Notable people with the surname include:

Ergican Saydam (1929–2009), Turkish pianist 
Nejat Saydam (1929–2000), Turkish film director, screenwriter, and actor 
Refik Saydam (1881–1942), Prime Minister of Turkey

Turkish-language surnames